Epiperipatus vespucci is a species of velvet worm in the Peripatidae family. This species is dark with a complex pattern on its dorsal surface. The male of this species has 30 pairs of legs; females have 33 or 34. The type locality is in Colombia.

References

Onychophorans of tropical America
Onychophoran species
Animals described in 1914